Outlaw Country is a Sirius XM Radio channel devoted to outlaw country music, along with various related genres including classic honky tonk, alternative country and roots rock. It is carried on Sirius XM Radio channel 60 and DISH Network channel 6060.

Programming 
Launched in May 2004 by Steven Van Zandt, Sirius XM Outlaw Country is "a sanctuary for the freaks, misfits, outcasts, rebels and renegades of country music." In 2010, Outlaw Country became the only country music channel to carry the XL label for explicit language.

Outlaw Country's regular DJs are Mojo Nixon ("The Loon in the Afternoon"); Elizabeth Cook; Dallas Wayne; The Rig Rocker; Meredith and Chris T.

Current specialty show hosts include:
 Steve Earle ("Hardcore Troubadour Radio")
 Hillbilly Jim ("Hillbilly Jim's Moonshine Matinee")
 Shooter Jennings ("Electric Rodeo")
 Johnny Knoxville and Roger Alan Wade ("The Big Ass Happy Family Jubilee")
 Buddy Miller and Jim Lauderdale ("The Buddy & Jim Show") 
 Elizabeth Cook ("Elizabeth Cook's Apron Strings")
 Dallas Wayne ("Deep in the Heart of Texas")
 Alamo Jones ("The Alamo Jones Show". Formerly "The Cowboy Jack Clement Show")
Paula Nelson (Daughter of Willie Nelson) ("The Paula Nelson Show")
Former hosts include:
 Fred Imus ("Fred's Trailer Park Bash", Imus died August 2011)
 Don Was ("The Motor City Hayride")
 Jack Clement ("The 'Cowyboy' Jack Clement Show", Clement's sidekick, Alamo Jones, took over the time slot with "The Alamo Jones Show" after Clement died in 2013)

Outlaw Country Cruise
The Outlaw Country Cruise is an annual seven-day cruise aboard the Norwegian Pearl from Miami, Florida to Great Stirrup Cay, Bahamas and Cozumel, Mexico. The cruise is attended by various artists and hosts heard on Outlaw Country. The cruise's 2023 lineup included The Mavericks, John Anderson, Lucinda Williams, Steve Earle, Ray Wylie Hubbard, Old 97's, Kathleen Edwards, Carlene Carter, Elizabeth Cook, The Waco Brothers, Mike and the Moonpies, Jesse Dayton, The Supersuckers, Vandoliers, Bill Kirchen, Redd Volkaert, Dallas Wayne, Tommy McLain, C.C. Adcock, Linda Gail Lewis, Joe Carrasco, Augie Meyers, Rosie Flores, Slim Jim Phantom, Warner E. Hodges, Sarah Borges, The Mastersons, Roger Alan Wade, Mary Lee's Corvette, Andrew Leahey, and Mojo Nixon.

Core artists
Lucinda Williams
Dwight Yoakam
Merle Haggard
Willie Nelson
Johnny Cash
Waylon Jennings
Steve Earle
Emmylou Harris
Jamey Johnson
Jason Isbell
Sturgill Simpson
Todd Snider
Band of Heathens
John Prine
The Cactus Blossoms

See also
 List of Sirius Satellite Radio stations

References

Sirius Satellite Radio channels
Sirius XM Radio channels
Radio stations established in 2004